The Ministry of Justice is an executive department of the New Zealand Government, responsible for the enforcement of the law and administration of justice within New Zealand. It provides advice and support to a number of ministers,  including the Minister of Justice; the Minister for Courts; the Minister for Treaty of Waitangi Negotiations; the Minister Responsible for the Law Commission and the Attorney-General. Additionally, due to its geographical proximity, New Zealand's Ministry of Justice might also oversee the administration of justice in Tokelau (New Zealand territory) and the Pitcairn Islands (even though it is a British Overseas Territory).

Leadership and staff 
The Ministry of Justice has a ten-member Strategic Leadership Team led by Andrew Kibblewhite, Secretary for Justice and Chief Executive. The Ministry employs approximately 3,800 staff around New Zealand. It delivers a variety of services including the administration of court services and the collection of fines. The Ministry also provides policy advice to the Minister of Justice, assists with the negotiation of Treaty of Waitangi claims and the running of parliamentary elections.

Ministers 

The Ministry serves 4 portfolios and 4 ministers.

Functions

Policy development 
The Ministry has a number of policy teams which provide advice to the Government of the day on legal issues and any new legislation which is being proposed. The teams conduct research and evaluate policy relating to civil, criminal, and constitutional law, foreshore and seabed issues and Treaty of Waitangi negotiations. The Ministry also manages input from the public when legislation on justice issues is being considered.

The New Zealand Law Commission also provides advice on legal and justice issues and is part of the justice sector. However, the Law Commission is an independent body whereas the Ministry of Justice is not. The MOJ provides advice to the Minister but ultimately is required to implement and administer whatever policies the government of the day passes into legislation.

Providing support to judiciary 
The Ministry ensures that judges are provided with administrative and technological support, as well as administering funding for judicial training and development. The Ministry has a difficult role in that it supports both the executive and the judicial arms of government. However, it co-operates with the judiciary to ensure that its constitutional independence from Government is maintained.

Operational services 
The Ministry's official website states: "The Ministry provides administration, case management and support services to the Supreme Court, Court of Appeal, High Court, District Court, special jurisdictions, and a range of tribunals and authorities in 103 locations around New Zealand". It also provides "registry services, claims administration, research services, hearings management, judicial support and report-writing services for the Waitangi Tribunal. The Ministry negotiates for the settlement of historical claims arising from the Treaty of Waitangi, and manages land for use in settlements".

Services provided by the Ministry include the administration of legal aid, the Public Defence Service, information about domestic violence and protection orders, separation and divorce, jury service, enforcing civil debt, and how to access wills and other records. The Ministry also provides advice to the Minister of Justice on miscarriages of justice, including the exercise of the royal prerogative of mercy and compensation for wrongful conviction and imprisonment.

Sector leadership 
The Ministry also provides leadership for the justice sector as a whole. As such it works with the New Zealand Police, the Department of Corrections and the Ministry of Social Development, the Law Commission and a number of other Crown entities. In 2011, a Sector Leadership Board was established chaired by the Secretary for Justice and responsible for improving the performance of these agencies involved in the criminal justice system.

Justice sector costs 
The Ministry's departmental expenditure for 2012/13 was $566 million and the non-departmental expenditure was $1,079 million. The Ministry's expenditure rose to $582 million in the year to 30 June 2017. Departmental expenditure is directly controlled by the Ministry and includes the cost of administering the courts and tribunals, the Legal Aid system, the Public Defence Service, collecting court fines and providing policy advice.  Non-departmental costs are administered but not under direct control by the Ministry.  They include Treaty of Waitangi Treaty Settlements, Judges' salaries and Legal Aid Payments. However the justice sector as a whole, including police and Corrections, has an operating budget of $3.8 billion a year and employs around 22,000 people. Over the next five years an additional $1.8 billion will be spent on new capital.  Around 80% of Justice sector expenditure is spent on criminal justice.

See also
 Corruption in New Zealand
Justice ministry
Law of New Zealand
Crime in New Zealand
New Zealand Law Commission
 Legal Aid in New Zealand

References

External links

Law of New Zealand
Government of New Zealand
New Zealand Public Service departments